Buzat (Buźat) is a rural locality (a selo) and the administrative centre of Buzatovsky Selsoviet, Sterlibashevsky District, Bashkortostan, Russia. The population was 722 as of 2010. There are 9 streets.

Geography 
Buzat is located 46 km southwest of Sterlibashevo (the district's administrative centre) by road. Maly Buzat is the nearest rural locality.

References 

Rural localities in Sterlibashevsky District